Anthro is a fictional superhero character published by DC Comics, presented as the "first boy", a Cro-Magnon born to Neanderthal parents. Anthro was created by cartoonist Howard Post; he first appeared in Showcase #74 (March 1968).

Publication history
After a single Showcase appearance, Anthro was given his own title, which lasted for 6 issues (1968–69). All six issues were written and drawn by Post, with Wallace Wood providing inking for the final issue.

Since the cancellation of his title, he has made minor appearances, most notably in Crisis on Infinite Earths #2. Subsequently, Anthro appeared in the 2006 revival of Tales of the Unexpected and the 2008 miniseries Final Crisis by Grant Morrison and J. G. Jones. Anthro also starred in the first story in DC Universe Holiday Special 2010.

Fictional character biography
Anthro is the first Cro-Magnon boy born in the Stone Age. His father, Neanderthal caveman Ne-Ahn, is the chief of his tribe; his mother, a captive member of another tribe. Winning two competing cavegirls as his wives, Cro-Magnon women Embra and Nima, Anthro begins the human race, as Embra lives to bear his first child.

Justice League Europe Annual #2 features a version of Anthro. In an alternate time-line, an older Silver Sorceress, lost in time, is rescued from a large creature by Anthro. He exhibits great eagerness, smashing the beast long after it is subdued. A bored cavegirl, seemingly either Embra or Nima, joins the Sorceress in watching Anthro's 'battle'.

Anthro is featured in the graphic novel "Doctor Thirteen: Architecture & Mortality". Speaking only French, he is soon melted out of a chunk of ice into what seems to be the modern day. He assists the Doctor, Infectious Lass, Genius Jones, Captain Fear and other somewhat heroic characters in a mission to keep their existence relevant. The story ends with his status seemingly threatened by the reader of the novel itself.

Issue one of Final Crisis features an extended introduction involving Anthro, where the New God Metron appears before the boy and gives him the knowledge and skill to make fire. This starts a sequence in which Anthro is able to fight off a group of savage raiders (led by Vandal Savage) with a burning stick. In this depiction, Anthro is much more caveman like in his attire, wearing only a loincloth and a satchel, and carrying stone and wood weapons while his body looks more like a modern teenager rather than having a Cro-Magnon appearance. In addition, he only expresses himself with ! and ? signs, as he is apparently unable to speak, as are the rest of the cavemen characters in the book. In the issue's pages, Anthro seems to have a vision of Kamandi. In the final issue of Final Crisis, Anthro appears as an old man, drawing the symbols he saw on Metron's body onto a cave wall. As he finishes drawing, he dies peacefully, watched over by Bruce Wayne, who is lost in time. The after-effects of Anthro's death on his friends and family is explored in the limited series Batman: The Return of Bruce Wayne.

During the "Dark Nights: Death Metal" storyline, Anthro is among the superheroes revived by Batman using a Black Lantern ring.

Powers and abilities
Anthro is a skilled tracker and hunter.

Other versions
Anthro had a supporting role in the Booster Gold series, starting with issue eight. In this story, as in Tales of the Unexpected, Anthro wears a leather jacket that resembles Mr. Terrific's, but has Anthro's name on the sleeves instead of "Fair Play". This is an alternate time-line Anthro, who is part of a resistance group against the murderous Maxwell Lord. Fellow members include Green Arrow, Hawkman, Wild Dog and Pantha. During the flight to Lord's headquarters, Anthro is taken out by a mind-controlled Superman.

In Final Crisis: Superman Beyond #1, Superman moves briefly through Earth-20, where alternate versions of a number of DC Comics older heroes exist as 'The Society of Super-Heroes', a group of 'pulp'-style mystery men led by Doc Fate and including Immortal Man. Writer Grant Morrison described it as a '1940s retro thing'. In The Multiversity - The Society of Super-Heroes: Conquerors from the Counter-World #1 (2014), it is revealed that Immortal Man of Earth-20 is Anthro, who was exposed to the same meteorite that bestowed Vandal Savage's powers on him. He and Doc Fate's Society of Super-Heroes are Earth-20's last defence from an invasion by their paired evil world, Earth-40, where the militia is led by Vandal Savage and Lady Shiva.

In other media
Anthro appears in the Batman: The Brave and the Bold episode "The Siege of Starro!". He is shown during a montage showcasing various heroes throughout history where he defeats Kru'll the Eternal after he attacks some cave people.

Anthro is mentioned in The CW's live-action Arrowverse series The Flash. In the episode "Failure Is An Orphan", Eobard Thawne tells Nora West-Allen / XS that he has been tracking the timeline "from Anthro the first boy to Kamandi the last".

References

External links
 Anthro at DC Database
 Anthro at Don Markstein's Toonopedia. Archived from the original on April 4, 2012.
 DCU Guide: Anthro

DC Comics fantasy characters
DC Comics titles
Fictional fishers
Fictional hunters in comics
Fictional prehistoric characters
Prehistoric people in popular culture
Comics characters introduced in 1968
Fiction about neanderthals